North Petherwin is a civil parish and village in the historic county of Devon and the ceremonial county of Cornwall, England, United Kingdom. The village is situated five miles (8 km) northwest of Launceston on a ridge above the River Ottery valley.

North Petherwin is a rural parish within the historic boundaries of Devon, having been transferred to Cornwall in 1966. Historically, the Dukes of Bedford have been major land owners in the parish. As well as the church town, settlements include Hellescott, Brazacott, and Maxworthy. The hamlets of Petherwin Gate and Daws are close to the village.

The Tamar Otter and Wildlife Centre is North Petherwin's main tourist attraction. As well as having European and Asian Short Clawed otters it has a duck pond, a nature trail where owls can be seen, a restaurant area and a gift shop.

Parish church and school
The parish church is dedicated to St Paternus (see also South Petherwin) and is unusually grand for a small village church. It was described in White's Devonshire Directory of 1850 as: ... an ancient structure, with a tower and five bells... (containing)... memorials of the Yeo and other families. The north aisle is Norman and the south Perpendicular and many of the windows, including those of the clerestory, are 13th century in style. There is some old woodwork including a communion rail dated 1685.

The tower now houses six bells, hung for full circle ringing in the English style. They are rung from the ground floor where the ringers are really part of the church as, unusually, the tower has not been screened off. In the North aisle, within the vestry, stands a fine two manual organ. The organ was extensively overhauled at the turn of this century and its thirteen speaking stops provide reliable accompaniment to services and concerts. 

The village has a school, North Petherwin Primary School, dating back to 1878. The school is coeducational and has been expanded in recent years.

References

External links

 Cornwall Record Office Online Catalogue for North Petherwin

Villages in Cornwall
Civil parishes in Cornwall
Holy wells in Cornwall
Places formerly in Devon